Associazione Sportiva Dilettantistica Augusta 1986 is a futsal club based in Augusta, Italy.

Honours
 Coppa Italia (Futsal): 
 Winner (2001)
Runner-up (2000), (2008)
European Futsal Cup Winners Cup:
Runner-up (2003)

See also
 Serie A (futsal)
 Divisione Calcio a 5

References

External links
 Official site

Futsal clubs in Italy
Sport in Sicily